Benjamin Duke Nabers (November 7, 1812 – September 6, 1878) was a U.S. Representative from Mississippi.

Biography
Born in Franklin, Tennessee, Nabers attended the common schools.
He moved to Hickory Flat, Mississippi.
He engaged as a commission merchant.
Held several local offices.

Nabers was elected as a Unionist to the Thirty-second Congress (March 4, 1851 – March 3, 1853).
He was an unsuccessful Unionist candidate for reelection in 1852 to the Thirty-third Congress.
He moved to Memphis, Tennessee.
He studied law.
He was admitted to the bar in 1860 and commenced practice in Memphis, Tennessee.
He served as presidential elector on the Constitutional-Union ticket of Bell and Everett in 1860.
He returned to Mississippi and settled at Holly Springs, Marshall County, in 1860.
Chancery clerk 1870-1874.
He served as member of the governing board of the Jackson State Penitentiary in Jackson, Mississippi, for two years.
He died at Holly Springs, Mississippi, September 6, 1878.
He was interred at the Hillcrest Cemetery in Holly Springs, Mississippi.

References 

1812 births
1878 deaths
People from Franklin, Tennessee
Unionist Party members of the United States House of Representatives from Mississippi
Mississippi Unionists
Tennessee Constitutional Unionists
1860 United States presidential electors
19th-century American politicians
People from Benton County, Mississippi
Burials at Hillcrest Cemetery
Members of the United States House of Representatives from Mississippi